The lieutenant governor of Nevada is a constitutional officer in the executive branch of government of the U.S. state of Nevada. The lieutenant governor maintains an office in Carson City, Nevada at the Nevada State Capitol and is elected separately from the Governor, and may therefore be from a different party than the Governor. The incumbent lieutenant governor is  Stavros Anthony, a Republican. He was sworn in in January 2023. The governor has the authority to appoint a replacement to fill the balance of the term in any vacant constitutional office, including that of the lieutenant governor, subject to Senate confirmation.

Powers and duties
Constitutionally, the lieutenant governor is first in the line of succession to the office of governor and is ex officio president of the Senate. In this capacity, the lieutenant governor serves as acting governor whenever the governor is out of state and succeeds to the executive office upon the permanent incapacitation of the governor. Moreover, as Senate president, the lieutenant governor presides over the Senate's daily proceedings whenever the Legislature is in session and may cast a tie-breaking vote. However, given the Senate is currently composed of an odd number of senators, ties are a rare occurrence. 

In addition, the lieutenant governor has a number of statutory duties. For example, the lieutenant governor chairs the Commission on Tourism and the Advisory Board on Outdoor Recreation and serves as vice chair of the Board of Directors of the Department of Transportation. Likewise, the lieutenant governor is a member on the governor's Cabinet, the Board of Economic Development, the Executive Branch Audit Committee, and the Commission on Homeland Security.

List of lieutenant governors
See List of governors of Nevada for a full list of lieutenant governors. Please note, this page does not have a full list of lieutenant governors either.

References

External links
 Nevada Lieutenant Governor

 
Lieut
Nevada